, provisional designation , is a sub-kilometer asteroid, classified as a near-Earth object and potentially hazardous asteroid of the Aten group, approximately  in diameter. It was discovered on 4 March 2008, by astronomers of the Mount Lemmon Survey at Mount Lemmon Observatory near Tucson, Arizona, United States.

Origin and orbital history 
 started its existence as part of a much larger body in the asteroid belt, with a likely diameter greater than 100 kilometers. 's immediate history likely started when its parent body experienced a large cratering event or, more likely, a catastrophic disruption event that resulted in a highly fractured, shattered, or reaccumulated object (rubble pile). As a result,  may have been produced as a reassembly of ejected fragments. The location of what is now  within this parent body is unknown.

This assumes that 's true albedo is considerably lower than 10%. If it does have a high albedo, a plausible source would be a population of high-albedo C-type asteroids in the inner asteroid belt. Second tier candidate families for the high-albedo case are Baptistina and Pallas.

From here, the newly liberated  began to change via the forces referred to as the Yarkovsky and YORP effects. The Yarkovsky effect describes a small force that affects orbital motion. It is caused by sunlight; when objects heat up in the Sun, they reradiate the energy away as heat, which in turn creates a tiny thrust. This recoil acceleration is much weaker than solar and planetary gravitational forces, but it can produce substantial orbital changes over timescales ranging from many millions to billions of years. The same physical phenomenon also creates a thermal torque that probably caused  to take on a top-like appearance.

Dynamical models indicate that  migrated inward across the inner asteroid belt over long timescales (i.e. the order of ~0.01–1 Gyr) until it reached a planetary gravitational resonance that drove it into the near-Earth asteroid (NEA) population over a timescale of the order of ~1 Myr. From there, gravitational interactions with both the planets and resonances allowed it to reach its current orbit within a few Myr to a few tens of Myr.

Close approaches 
On 23 December 2008,  made a close approach to Earth at a distance of 8.4 lunar distances (0.022 AU, 3.2 million km), its closest until 2169. Its brightness peaked on 26 December about 13.2 magnitude.

Physical characteristics 

 is an oblate spheroid (also described as "muffin-shaped")
 in diameter. It rotates very slowly in a retrograde direction. There is a  diameter concave feature, possibly an impact crater, or a relic feature from a previous episode of rapid rotation that caused the asteroid's shape to reconfigure.

Visible and near-infrared spectroscopy show that 's composition is similar to that of carbonaceous chondrite meteorites.

Sample return mission 
 was the preliminary baseline target of NASA's proposed sample-return  Asteroid Redirect Mission. Besides , several other asteroids, including Itokawa and Bennu, were considered for this mission, before its cancellation in 2017.

See also 
 Asteroid Redirect Mission
 List of minor planets: 341001–342000

References

External links 
 Asteroid Lightcurve Database (LCDB), query form (info )
 Asteroids and comets rotation curves, CdR – Observatoire de Genève, Raoul
 
 
 

341843
341843
341843
341843
341843
20080304
20231220